Kiss is a 2009 thriller novel by Christian author Ted Dekker and Erin Healy.

Plot summary

Shauna McAllister is unable to recall past events and it all started six weeks after a car accident that left her suffering a coma. She doesn’t recall anything about the accident, as well as the months leading up to the accident. Allegations surface that effect Shauna, and her father, Landon McAllister. Landon is head of McAllister MediVista, a pharmaceutical research company, who is a senator that has his eyes on the White House. Shauna is somewhat aware that something stands in the way for their relationship to be reconciled. Her brother Rudy who is her only ally, and her father’s favorite is the victim in the very accident she is being blamed for.

Shauna turns to Wayne Spade, her forgotten boyfriend, to help her piece things together to figure out the events that led up to the accident. On her journey for answers she discovers a mental ability which causes more questions to be raised. She begins to lose trust in all those around her, and it starts to become clear that those around her are determined to keep her from recovering her memories that she pursues.

Critical reception

Belinda Elliott of The Christian Broadcasting Network describes the novel.

- "Kiss moves along at a steady pace. The convincing characters pull the reader in, and the plot twists keep them turning pages to see what happens next. As with most Dekker novels, the spiritual themes are subtle. Readers will find no sermons here. But the story does offer a poignant look at the purpose of suffering and pain in our lives. Is it necessary to experience one (and live with the memories of it) in order to enjoy the other? The novel allows readers to decide."

References

2009 American novels
American Christian novels
American thriller novels
Novels by Ted Dekker